Wallace Butte is a -elevation summit located in western Grand Canyon, in Coconino County of northern Arizona, United States. It is located on the South Rim, about 1.0 mile northwest of the Grand Scenic Divide across Bass Canyon. Wallace Butte is 1.73 miles northeast of Mount Huethawali, and the butte lies about 3/4 mile south of the west-flowing Colorado River.

Geology

The large Huxley Terrace (photo), is composed of the Supai Group  – 4 units. Notably, rock units 4 and 2 are cliff-formers, and the entire Supai Group sits on the cliff-former (and platform-former) of the Redwall Limestone.

For Wallace Butte, geologically it is a cliff and slope-former remainder – of Supai Group units 2 and 1 (Manakacha Formation, Watahomigi Formation). The cliffs of the Manakacha protect the slope-former below; (with the height of 349 ft, the landform is triangular, thin, and ~350 ft long, by ~150 ft wide); (See here:) both units are on the top platform of the Redwall, the Redwall Limestone upper platform being a common rock unit throughout the Grand Canyon as landform points, (surrounding prominences), or as platforms supporting numerous rock units above, nearby examples being Geikie Peak and Whites Butte.

References

External links

 Aerial view, Wallace Butte (and northeast terminus of Huxley Terrace), Mountainzone
 Wallace Butte photo by Harvey Butchart
 Wallace Butte seen from Huxley Terrace

Buttes of Arizona
Grand Canyon
Grand Canyon National Park
Grand Canyon, South Rim
Grand Canyon, South Rim (west)
North American 1000 m summits